M. Mani, also known as Aroma Mani is an Indian film producer and director in Malayalam and Tamil film industry. He has produced more than 60 movies and directed more than 10 movies under the banner Sunitha Productions and Aroma Movie International. He made his debut with the movie Dheerasameere Yamunaatheere in 1977.

Awards
 1985: National Film Award for Best Feature Film in Malayalam for Thinkalaazhcha Nalla Divasam
 1986: National Film Award for Best Film on Other Social Issues for Doore Doore Oru Koodu Koottam

Filmography

Malayalam

Production

 Dheerasameere Yamunaatheere (1977)
 Urakkam Varaatha Raathrikal (1978)
 Rowdy Ramu (1978)
 Enikku Njaan Swantham (1979)
 Neeyo Njaano (1979)
 Kalliyankattu Neeli (1979)
 Ithile Vannavar (1980)
 Eden Thottam (1980)
 Kallan Pavithran (1981)
 Pinneyum Pookkunna Kaadu (1981)
 Oru Thira Pinneyum Thira (1982)
 Aa Divasam (1982)
 Kuyilinethedi (1983)
 Engine Nee Marakkum (1983)
 Muthodu Muthu (1984)
 Veendum Chalikkunna Chakram (1984)
 Ente Kalithozhan (1984)
 Aanakkorumma (1985)
 Thinkalazhcha Nalla Divasam (1985)
 Pachavelicham (1985)
 Doore Doore Oru Koodu Koottam (1986)
 Ponnumkudathinum Pottu (1986)
 Love Story (1986)
 Irupatham Noottandu (1987)
 Oru CBI Diary Kurippu (1988)
 August 1 (1988)
 Jagratha(1989)
 Kottayam Kunjachan (1990)
 Soorya Gayathri (1992)
 Pandu Pandoru Rajakumari (1992)
 Dhruvam (1993)
 Rudraksham (1994)
 Commissioner (1994)
 Janathipathyam (1997)
 Pallavur Devanarayanan (1999)
 Prem Poojari (1999)
 F. I. R (1999)
Naranathu Thampuran (2001)
 Kattuchembakam (2002)
Mr. Brahmachari (2003)
 Balettan (2003)
 Maampazhakkaalam (2004)
 Lokanathan IAS (2005)
 Raavanan (2006)
 Kanaka Simhasanam (2006)
 Colours (2009)
 Oru Black and White Kudumbam (2009)
 Drona 2010 (2010)
 August 15 (2011)
 Artist (2013)

Direction
 Aa Divasam (1982)
 Kuyiline Thedi (1983)
 Engine Nee Marakkum (1983)
 Muthodu Muthu (1984)
 Ente Kalithozhan (1984)
 Aanakkorumma (1985)
 Pachavelicham (1985)

Story
 Aa Divasam (1982)

Tamil
 Gomathi Nayagam (2005)
 Kasi (2001)
 Unnudan (1998)
 Arangetra Velai (1990)

References

External links

Malayalam film directors
Malayalam film producers
Living people
Film directors from Thiruvananthapuram
Film producers from Thiruvananthapuram
Tamil film directors
Tamil screenwriters
20th-century Indian dramatists and playwrights
21st-century Indian dramatists and playwrights
20th-century Indian film directors
Screenwriters from Thiruvananthapuram
Producers who won the Best Film on Other Social Issues National Film Award
Year of birth missing (living people)